Svenska Akademiens ordbok, abbreviated SAOB, is a dictionary published by the Swedish Academy, with the official title Ordbok över svenska språket utgiven av Svenska Akademien. This dictionary is the Swedish counterpart of the Oxford English Dictionary (OED) or the Deutsches Wörterbuch (DWB). 

Work on the dictionary started in 1787 and the first volume was published in 1898 and as of 2021, when the latest volume appeared, work has progressed to the letter Å inclusively, leaving only the letters Ä and Ö to be finished. The dictionary has approximately 450,000 main entries. The searchable web version has been available since 1997.

See also
Svenska Akademiens ordlista

References

External links 
Svenska Akademiens ordbok
The Swedish Academy – Official site (in English)

Swedish non-fiction literature
Swedish Academy
Publications established in 1898
Swedish dictionaries
Online dictionaries
1898 establishments in Sweden